NeuroImage: Clinical is an online-only open access scientific journal covering clinical neuroimaging research. It was established in 2012 and is published by Elsevier as a sister journal to NeuroImage. The editor-in-chief is Andrew Zalesky. According to the Journal Citation Reports, the journal has a 2019 impact factor of 4.350.

References

External links

Neuroimaging journals
Publications established in 2012
Online-only journals
Creative Commons Attribution-licensed journals
Elsevier academic journals
English-language journals